André Piganiol (17 January 1883 – 24 May 1968) was a French historian and archaeologist.

He was a professor at the University of Strasbourg and at the Sorbonne, then in 1942 became a professor of Roman civilization at the Collège de France.

Published works 
 L’Impôt de capitation sous le Bas-Empire (1916)
 Essai sur les origines de Rome (1917)
 Recherches sur les jeux romains : notes d'archéologie et d'histoire religieuse (1923)
 La Conquête romaine (1927)
 Esquisse d'histoire romaine (1931)
 L'Empereur Constantin (1932)
 Histoire de Rome (1934)
 L'Empire chrétien, 325-395 (1947)
 Les Documents cadastraux de la colonie romaine d’Orange (1962)
 Le sac de Rome (1964)
 Scripta varia (3 volumes, 1973)

References

Bibliography 

Writers from Le Havre
1883 births
1968 deaths
École Normale Supérieure alumni
Academic staff of the Collège de France
French archaeologists
French scholars of Roman history
French male non-fiction writers
Members of the Académie des Inscriptions et Belles-Lettres
20th-century French historians
20th-century archaeologists
20th-century French male writers
Corresponding Fellows of the British Academy